Busey may refer to:

 Gary Busey, American actor
 Jake Busey, American actor, son of Gary Busey
 Diablo Cody, pen name of Academy Award-winning screenwriter Brooke Busey-Hunt
 Busey Bank, US-based financial holding company